Planina pod Šumikom is a dispersed settlement in the Pohorje Hills in the Municipality of Slovenska Bistrica in northeastern Slovenia. The area is part of the traditional region of Styria. It is now included with the rest of the municipality in the Drava Statistical Region.

Name
The name of the settlement was changed from Planina to Planina pod Šumnikom in 1955.

Church
The local church is dedicated to the Three Kings and belongs to the Parish of Tinje. It dates to the early 16th century.

References

External links
Planina pod Šumikom at Geopedia

Populated places in the Municipality of Slovenska Bistrica